Duplexe Tchamba Bangou (born 10 July 1998) is a Cameroonian professional footballer who plays as a centre-back for Casa Pia, on loan from Danish Superliga club SønderjyskE.

Professional career
Tchamba was a product of the TAD Sport Academy in Cameroon, and moved to Strasbourg on 22 March 2017. He made his professional debut for Strasbourg in a 1–0 Coupe de France win over Grenoble Foot 38 on 16 January 2019.

After a two-year loan spell at Norwegian club Strømsgodset, Tchamba signed a four-year deal with Danish Superliga club SønderjyskE on 2 July 2021. After a season, which for SønderjyskE ended with relegation to the Danish 1st Division, the club confirmed on 1 September 2022, that Tchamba had joined Portuguese club Casa Pia on a season-long loan deal.

International career
Tchamba represented Cameroon U20s at the 2017 Africa U-20 Cup of Nations, and the Cameroon U23s in a set of friendlies. He debuted with the senior Cameroon national team in a 1–0 friendly win over Nigeria on 4 June 2021.

References

External links
 
 

1998 births
Living people
Footballers from Yaoundé
Association football defenders
Cameroonian footballers
Cameroon international footballers
Cameroon youth international footballers
RC Strasbourg Alsace players
Strømsgodset Toppfotball players
SønderjyskE Fodbold players
Casa Pia A.C. players
Ligue 1 players
Championnat National 3 players
Eliteserien players
Cameroonian expatriate footballers
Cameroonian expatriate sportspeople in France
Expatriate footballers in France
Cameroonian expatriate sportspeople in Norway
Expatriate footballers in Norway
Cameroonian expatriate sportspeople in Denmark
Expatriate men's footballers in Denmark
Cameroonian expatriate sportspeople in Portugal
Expatriate footballers in Portugal